Lars Malmkvist (born 24 September 1955) is a Swedish wrestler. He competed at the 1976 Summer Olympics and the 1980 Summer Olympics.

References

External links
 

1955 births
Living people
Swedish male sport wrestlers
Olympic wrestlers of Sweden
Wrestlers at the 1976 Summer Olympics
Wrestlers at the 1980 Summer Olympics
Sportspeople from Malmö
20th-century Swedish people